is a female singer-songwriter and hairdresser in Japan.

Musical characteristics 
Nakayama, in addition to singing, plays the accordion, trumpet, and guitar. When performing live, she is usually accompanied by four supporting members playing guitar, bass, drums and percussion. Additional support members playing trumpet, saxophone, trombone, tuba, and violin join the band during live tours and rock festivals.

Nakayama's music is a blend of world accordion music, Gypsy Jazz, Musette, and Tango. She sings with a low, warm, smooth and soft voice.
Her CDs are categorized as J-pop in CD shops, and as jazz by iTunes in Japan.

Most of Nakayama's lyrics are in Japanese; a few songs are instrumental or feature scat singing. Her lyrics frequently evoke nostalgic scenes, festivals, harbor towns, and sunsets as lyrical motifs. She sings some cover versions of Japanese folk music, which are thought to have influenced her original works.

Discography

Singles 
 2008:  – Did not chart.
 2009:  – Did not chart.

Studio albums 
 2006: Uri Nakayama-EP (EP, iTunes release only)
 2006: Moons, Stars, and Dreams (Live album, iTunes release only)
 2007: DoReMiFa – peaked at No. 137.
 2007:  – peaked at No. 196.
 2008:  (extended play) – peaked at No. 279.
 2008:  – peaked at No. 137.
 2010:  (Cover album)
 2011: Viva – released February 16, 2011

Concert DVDs 
 2009: LE TOUR DE QUESERA 2008

References

External links 
 Official site 

1981 births
Living people
Japanese women singer-songwriters
Japanese singer-songwriters
Musicians from Saitama Prefecture
21st-century Japanese singers
21st-century Japanese women singers